Heater is a surname. Notable people with the surname include:

 Chuck Heater (born 1952), American football player and coach
 Danny Heater (born 1942), American high school basketball record holder
 Don Heater (born 1950), American football running back
 Larry Heater (born 1958), American football running back

See also
 Herter